"Know" is a song by American singer Mary J. Blige. It was written by Blige, Mark "Sounwave" Spears, and Denisia “Blue June” Andrews and Brittany “Chi Coney” Coney from songwriting duo Nova Wav, while production was helmed by Spears. The song was released as a single on August 8, 2019, and peaked at number 12 on the US Adult R&B Songs.

Background
"Know" was written by Blige along with Mark "Sounwave" Spears, and Denisia “Blue June” Andrews and Brittany “Chi Coney” Coney from songwriting duo Nova Wav. Production was overseen by Top Dawg's Spears. The song is built around a sample of the song “Reflections” (1973) by Detroit singer Albert Jones which lays the groundwork for the thumping beat and is looped throughout the song. Words by Jones open the song.

Track listing

Credits and personnel 
Credits adapted from the liner notes of "Know."

Denisia  Andrews – writer
Mary J. Blige – writer
Brittany Coney – writer

Tony Maserati – mixing
Mark Spears – producer, writer

Charts

Release history

References

2019 singles
2019 songs
Mary J. Blige songs
Songs written by Sounwave
Songs written by Mary J. Blige